The Tuscumbia Railway was chartered on January 16, 1830, and a 2.1 mile railroad was built from downtown Tuscumbia, Alabama to the docks on the Tennessee River west of Sheffield. This was the first railroad chartered or constructed west of the Appalachian Mountains. The purpose of this railroad was to allow transport of cotton bales to a new wharf on the Tennessee River. Also the name of a tourist railroad constructed in city-owned Spring Park.

With the success of this small railroad, a new railroad was built from Tuscumbia to Decatur via Courtland.  The Tennessee River has a stretch of shallow rapids between these points known as the Muscle Shoals, which make river transport impossible. This railroad was designed to bypass that obstacle.  Thus, the Tuscumbia, Courtland and Decatur Railroad came into being just two years later.

See also
 Oldest railroads in North America

References

External links
 Tuscumbia Railway Company

Defunct Alabama railroads
Transportation in Colbert County, Alabama
Florence–Muscle Shoals metropolitan area
Predecessors of the Southern Railway (U.S.)
Railway companies established in 1830
Railway companies disestablished in 1850
1830 establishments in Alabama
American companies established in 1830